Surendra Hamal is a Nepalese weightlifter. He competed in the men's lightweight event at the 1984 Summer Olympics.

References

External links
 

Year of birth missing (living people)
Living people
Nepalese male weightlifters
Olympic weightlifters of Nepal
Weightlifters at the 1984 Summer Olympics
Place of birth missing (living people)
20th-century Nepalese people